The Queen of the Valley was a named train of the Central Railroad of New Jersey (CNJ) that ran between Jersey City, New Jersey, and Harrisburg, Pennsylvania, via the Lehigh Valley and Reading. The train took about 4  hours to traverse the  route, the longest in the CNJ system (exceeding the Atlantic City-bound Blue Comet.) First operated in 1911, it was the longest-running train of the CNJ when discontinued in 1967.

Route

From Communipaw Terminal in Jersey City, the Queen of the Valley traveled south to Bayonne (but not stopping, until the train's later years), traversed the harbor at Elizabethport, headed west along the CNJ's Main Line. It continued past Elizabeth's CNJ station, Plainfield Station, to High Point station and Hampton, the end point for the regular NJ Transit Raritan Valley Line commuter service. From there, the route continued to Phillipsburg's Union Station, Easton, Pennsylvania, Bethlehem's Bethlehem Station and Allentown's Allentown Station. From Allentown, the train traveled along the territory of the Reading Railroad, continuing west to Reading (Reading Outer station) and finally to Harrisburg.

History

In the mid-1930s the Queen of the Valley ran six days a week. In the early 1960s it was daily in operation.

In the train's waning years in 1963, the route was shortened from Harrisburg and Reading to Allentown, owing to the loss of mail contracts. Following the creation of the new Aldene Connection in 1967 and the closure of the CNJ Terminal in New Jersey, the train was terminated. However, some commuter service on the Allentown to Newark (via the new Aldene Connection) continued.

References

Central Railroad of New Jersey
Named passenger trains of the United States
Passenger rail transportation in Pennsylvania
Passenger rail transportation in New Jersey
Railway services introduced in 1911
Railway lines closed in 1967
Railway services discontinued in 1967